Mexican redhorse (Moxostoma austrinum) is a species of ray-finned fish in the genus moxostoma.

Footnotes 
 

Moxostoma
Fish described in 1880